Jorge Aarón Claros Juárez (born 8 January 1986) is a Honduran footballer, who plays for Alajuelense.

Club career
Claros started his career at Vida before joining Honduran giants F.C. Motagua in 2005. In January 2012 he went on trial at Scottish club Rangers. He then went on trial with another Scottish club, Hibernian, and he signed a loan contract with Hibernian on 31 January. Claros helped Hibernian to reach the 2012 Scottish Cup Final, but he was substituted during the first half of a 5–1 defeat to Hearts. On 16 January 2013, Hibs stated that the clubs were in discussions about the possibility of extending the loan agreement. Later in January, the deal was extended until the end of the 2012–13 season. Claros helped Hibernian reach the 2013 Scottish Cup Final, which ended in a 3–0 defeat to Celtic. He was offered a long-term contract by Hibernian, but returned to Motagua because they continued to demand a large transfer fee.

Claros signed with Major League Soccer club Sporting Kansas City on 16 July 2014.

International career
Claros was a member of the Honduras national football team at the 2005 Youth World Cup in Netherlands and the 2008 Summer Olympics in Beijing. He made his debut for the senior national team in an August 2006 friendly match against Venezuela and has, as of July 2012, earned a total of 30 caps, scoring 2 goals. He has represented his country in 3 FIFA World Cup qualification matches and played at the 2007 and 2011 UNCAF Nations Cups as well as at the 2007 CONCACAF Gold Cup.

Claros was recalled to the national team in September 2012 for 2014 FIFA World Cup qualification matches against Cuba. He scored the only goal of the game in a 2013 CONCACAF Gold Cup match against El Salvador, which meant that Honduras secured a place in the knockout stages of the tournament. He helped Honduras qualify for the 2014 FIFA World Cup, where they were drawn with France, Ecuador and Switzerland. Claros played as a substitute in their first game, a 3–0 defeat by France. He then came into the starting lineup for the second match, as Wilson Palacios had been sent off against France. Claros "added some composure", but Honduras lost 2–1 to Ecuador.

International goals
Scores and results list Honduras' goal tally first.

Shooting
Claros was shot in the head on 16 June 2011 after car thieves failed to steal his vehicle. As he stopped his car to drop off a friend, 2 unidentified men with pistols shot at them, and Claros was hit in the shoulder and in the head. Claros managed to drive himself to the hospital and it was found that the wounds were not near fatal. Within three weeks Claros was back playing football for Motagua, his club at the time.

Career statistics

International

Honours and awards

Club
F.C. Motagua
Honduran Liga Nacional (2): 2006–07 A, 2010–11 C
Copa Interclubes UNCAF (1): 2007 UNCAF

Country
Honduras
Copa Centroamericana (1): 2011

References

External links
 
 

1986 births
Living people
People from La Ceiba
Association football midfielders
Honduran footballers
Honduras international footballers
Footballers at the 2008 Summer Olympics
Olympic footballers of Honduras
2007 UNCAF Nations Cup players
2007 CONCACAF Gold Cup players
2011 Copa Centroamericana players
2013 CONCACAF Gold Cup players
2014 FIFA World Cup players
2015 CONCACAF Gold Cup players
2017 Copa Centroamericana players
2017 CONCACAF Gold Cup players
C.D.S. Vida players
F.C. Motagua players
Hibernian F.C. players
Sporting Kansas City players
Liga Nacional de Fútbol Profesional de Honduras players
Scottish Premier League players
Major League Soccer players
Honduran expatriate footballers
Expatriate footballers in Scotland
Shooting survivors
Expatriate soccer players in the United States
Copa Centroamericana-winning players
Expatriate footballers in China
Qingdao Hainiu F.C. (1990) players
China League One players